Oscar De La Hoya vs. Rafael Ruelas, billed as "La Batalla", was a professional boxing match contested on May 6, 1995 for the WBO and IBF lightweight championships. The fight is notable for being the first pay-per-view headlined by De La Hoya, who would eventually go on to become the second biggest draw in boxing pay-per-view history.

Background
Only two years into his professional career, the then 22-year-old Oscar De La Hoya was the reigning WBO lightweight champion and had already captured two world titles in two different divisions after previously holding the WBO junior lightweight title. De La Hoya had just made the third successful defense against arguably his toughest opponent to date, defeating three-time super featherweight world champion John John Molina by unanimous decision. De La Hoya's victory over Molina would officially set up a unification bout with IBF lightweight champion Rafael Ruelas, who had made two successful defenses after winning the title from Freddie Pendleton the previous year. The fight was heavily hyped and HBO decided to air the bout on pay-per-view (via their pay-per-view service TVKO) after De La Hoya had made several high-rated appearances on HBO World Championship Boxing. It was the first of 19 pay-per-view events that would be headlined by De La Hoya.

Fight
De La Hoya had little trouble with Ruelas and dominated the first round with his left jabs, landing 24 of them, while Ruelas was unable to get going offensively and didn't land a single jab in the round. Early in the round De La Hoya caught Ruelas with a shot that seemed to daze Rualas and affected his balance throughout the round. De La Hoya ended the fight in the second. With a little past a minute gone by, De La Hoya dropped Ruelas to the canvas with a left hook. Rualas got back up, and though clearly hurt, was allowed to continue. De La Hoya quickly dropped Ruelas for the second time with a right hand soon after. Referee Richard Steele again allowed Ruelas to continue, but De La Hoya again went on the attack and landed a flurry of unanswered punches, causing Steele to quickly step in and end the fight. at 1:43 of the round.

References

1995 in boxing
1995 in sports in Nevada
Ruelas
Boxing in Las Vegas
May 1995 sports events in the United States
Caesars Palace